The Journal of Literary & Cultural Disability Studies is an academic journal covering cultural and especially literary representations of disability, containing a wide variety of textual analyses that are informed by disability theory and, by extension, experiences of disability. It was established in 2006 and launched at the Inaugural Conference of the Cultural Disability Studies Research Network, Liverpool John Moores University, 2007. It moved to Liverpool University Press in 2009. 

The editor-in-chief is David Bolt (Liverpool Hope University).

See also
Critical theory
Disability studies

References

External links 

Print 
Online: 

Literary magazines published in the United Kingdom
Disability publications
Disability studies
Liverpool University Press books